Hälsingfors is a village in Lycksele Municipality, Västerbotten County, Sweden, very near to Lycksele Airport.

References

Villages in Sweden